Ezop  is a 1969 Bulgarian-Czechoslovak film. The film starred Josef Kemr and Davzad Twast-Kafka. It was a minor success upon release, with the film's repeated line 'to help me' becoming symbolic of Prague in the early 1970s.

References

1969 films
Czechoslovak drama films
1960s Czech-language films
Czech drama films
1960s Czech films
Bulgarian drama films